Viscount  was a Japanese politician who served as a member of the House of Peers, as Prime Minister of Japan from 1921 to 1922, and as the head of the Bank of Japan and Ministry of Finance.

Takahashi made many contributions to Japan's development during the early 20th century, including introducing its first patent system and securing foreign financing for the Russo-Japanese War. Following the onset of the Great Depression, he introduced controversial financial policies which included abandoning the gold standard, lowering interest rates, and using the Bank of Japan to finance deficit spending by the central government. His decision to cut government spending in 1935 led to unrest within the Japanese military, who assassinated him in February 1936. Takahashi's policies are credited for pulling Japan out of the Depression, but led to soaring inflation following his assassination, as Takahashi's successors became highly reluctant to cut off funding to the government.

Early life
Takahashi was born in Edo (modern-day Tokyo), while Japan was still under the Tokugawa shogunate. He was the illegitimate son of a court painter in residence at Edo Castle, and adopted as the son of Takahashi Kakuji, a low-ranking samurai in the service of the Date daimyō of Sendai Domain. He studied English language and American culture in a private school run by the missionary James Hepburn (the forerunner of Meiji Gakuin University). On 25 July 1867, he set sail from Japan to Oakland, California, in the United States, and found employment as a menial laborer. Another version of the story has it that he went to the United States to study, but was sold as a slave by his landlord and only with some difficulty was he able to return to Japan.

Career

After his return to Japan in 1868, Takahashi taught English conversation. He later became the first master of the Kyōritsu Gakkō high school in Tokyo, (currently Kaisei High School), and at the same time worked as a low-ranking bureaucrat in the Ministry of Education, and then in the Ministry of Agriculture and Commerce. He was appointed as the first chief of the Bureau of Patents, a department of the Ministry of Agriculture and Commerce, and helped organized the patent system in Japan. At one point, he resigned his government positions and went to Peru to start a silver mining enterprise, but failed.

Takahashi became an employee of the Bank of Japan in 1892, and his talents were soon recognized, as he rose to become vice-president in 1898.

During and after the Russo-Japanese War of 1904–1905, Takahashi raised foreign loans that were critical to Japan's war effort. He met personally with American financier Jacob Schiff, who floated half of Japan's loans in the U.S. He also raised loans from the Rothschild family in Britain.

For this success, he was appointed to the House of Peers of the Diet of Japan in 1905.

Takahashi was named president of the Yokohama Specie Bank in 1906. He was made a baron (danshaku) under the kazoku peerage system in 1907.

Takahashi was Governor of the Bank of Japan from 1 June 1911, through 20 February 1913.

Political offices

In 1913, Takahashi was appointed Minister of Finance by Prime Minister Yamamoto Gonnohyōe and then joined the Rikken Seiyūkai political party. He was re-appointed by Prime Minister Hara Takashi in 1918. In 1920, Takahashi's title was elevated to viscount (shishaku). After Hara was assassinated in 1921, Takahashi was appointed both Prime Minister and the Rikken Seiyūkai party president.

Takahashi was the second Christian Prime Minister in Japanese history. His term lasted less than seven months, primarily due to his inability as an outsider to control the factions in his party, and his lack of a power base in the party.

After resigning as Prime Minister, Takahashi still retained the position of president of the Rikken Seiyūkai. He resigned his seat in the House of Peers in 1924, and was elected to a seat in the Lower House of the Diet of Japan in the 1924 General Election. When Katō Takaaki became the prime minister and set up a coalition cabinet in 1924, Takahashi accepted the post of Minister of Agriculture and Commerce. He divided the department into the Ministry of Agriculture and Forestry and the Ministry of Commerce and Industry. Takahashi resigned from the Rikken Seiyūkai in 1925.

Takahashi served as Finance Minister under the administrations of Tanaka Giichi (1927–1929), Inukai Tsuyoshi (1931–1932), Saitō Makoto (1932–1934) and Okada Keisuke (1934–1936). To bring Japan out of the Great Depression of 1929, he instituted dramatically expansionary monetary and fiscal policy, abandoning the gold standard in December 1931, and running deficits. Despite considerable success, his fiscal policies involving reduction of military expenditures created many enemies within the military; and he was among those assassinated by rebelling military officers in the February 26 Incident of 1936. His grave is at the Tama Reien Cemetery in Fuchū, Tokyo. Along with Saitō Makoto (who was also assassinated during the Incident), Takahashi would be the last former Japanese prime minister to be assassinated until Shinzo Abe’s assassination 86 years later in 2022.

Honours
From the corresponding article in the Japanese Wikipedia

Peerages
Baron (23 September 1907)
Viscount (7 September 1920)

Decorations
 Grand Cordon of the Order of the Sacred Treasure (1 April 1906; 5th Class: 28 December 1902; 6th Class: 25 October 1889)
 Grand Cordon of the Order of the Rising Sun (7 September 1920)
 Grand Cross of the Légion d'honneur (3 July 1924)
 Grand Cordon of the Order of the Paulownia Flowers (3 June 1927)
 Grand Cordon of the Order of the Chrysanthemum (26 February 1936; posthumous)
Senior Second Rank (26 February 1936; posthumous)

Legacy

 Takahashi appeared on a 50 Yen banknote issued by the Bank of Japan in 1951. It is the only time that a former president of the Bank of Japan has appeared on one of Japan's banknotes.
 Takahashi's Tokyo residence is now the "Takahashi Korekiyo Memorial Park" in Tokyo's Minato Ward, Akasaka. However, a portion of the building survives in the Edo-Tokyo Open Air Architectural Museum in Koganei city, Tokyo.
 Takahashi's fiscal and monetary policies during the Great Depression were in many ways similar to what Keynes later published just a few years later in 1936 in The General Theory of Employment, Interest and Money.  It is thought but not proven that Takahashi's success contributed heavily to Keynes' theories.
 Ben Bernanke, chairman of the United States Federal Reserve, characterized Takahashi as a man who "brilliantly rescued Japan from the Great Depression", and Japanese prime minister Shinzō Abe cited Takahashi as an inspiration for his Abenomics policies. On the other hand, Bank of Japan president Masaaki Shirakawa characterized Takahashi's policies of central bank support for the government as a "bitter experience", and in 1982 the Bank of Japan itself characterized Takahashi's Depression-era policies as "the bank's biggest mistake in its 100-year history".

Notes

References
 Bix, Herbert P. (2000). Hirohito and the Making of Modern Japan. New York: HarperCollins. ; 
 Jansen, Marius B. (2000). The Making of Modern Japan. Cambridge: Harvard University Press. ; 
 Myung Soo Cha, "Did Takahashi Korekiyo Rescue Japan from the Great Depression?," The Journal of Economic History 63, No. 1 (Mar 2003): 127–44.
 Nanto, Dick K. and Shinji Takagi, "Korekiyo Takahashi and Japan's Recovery from the Great Depression," American Economic Review 75, No. 2 (May 1985): 369–74.
 Smethurst, Richard J. (2007). From Foot Soldier to Finance Minister: Takahashi Korekiyo, Japan's Keynes. Cambridge: Harvard  University Press.
 __. (2002). "Takahashi Korekiyo's Fiscal Policy and the Rise of Militarism in Japan During the Great Depression," in Turning Points in Japanese History, ed. Bert Edström. Japan Library.
 Wolferen, Karl van. The Enigma of Japanese Power: People and Politics in a Stateless Nation. Vintage; Reprint edition (1990). 
 Tsuboi, Kenichi Escape from the Showa Financial Panic and Korekiyo Takahashi's Inflation Policies, Diamond Weekly (2012).  (in Japanese).

External links
 

1854 births
1936 deaths
20th-century prime ministers of Japan
Assassinated prime ministers of Japan
Assassinated Japanese politicians
Assassinated nobility
Businesspeople from Tokyo
Commissioners of the Japan Patent Office
Deaths by firearm in Japan
Government ministers of Japan
Governors of the Bank of Japan
Japanese accountants
Japanese Protestants
Kazoku
Members of the House of Peers (Japan)
Members of the House of Representatives (Empire of Japan)
Ministers of Finance of Japan
People murdered in Tokyo
People of Meiji-period Japan
Politicians from Tokyo
Prime Ministers of Japan
Rikken Seiyūkai politicians